Ludia mauritiana is a species of evergreen tree in the family Salicaceae. It is native to southeastern Africa and Madagascar. It was first described by the German botanist Johann Friedrich Gmelin, the type locality being Mauritius.

Description
The bark is grey and the twigs have numerous lenticels. The leaves are leathery and glossy, with entire margins, wedge-shaped bases and obtuse apexes. The flowers appear singly in the axils of the leaves. They are bisexual, small and yellowish-white. They are followed by globular, berry-like capsules that turn reddish as they dry.

Distribution
Ludia mauritiana is native to southeastern Africa and is found in Kenya, Tanzania, Mozambique, Madagascar, Mayotte, Mauritius and the Seychelles. It grows in varying types of soil including laterite, sandy soils and limestone soils.

Uses
The wood of this tree is hard and dense. It is used as poles for construction work, railway sleepers and mine props, and to make furniture, implements and tool handles, but the small size of the tree limits the utility of its timber and it is only used locally. It is also made into charcoal and used for firewood.

References

Salicaceae
Taxa named by Johann Friedrich Gmelin
Trees of Madagascar
Flora of Mauritius
Flora of Seychelles
Trees of Kenya
Flora of Tanzania
Northern Zanzibar–Inhambane coastal forest mosaic